The Museum of Art, Architecture and Technology (MAAT) is a museum in Lisbon, Portugal.

The Museum 

MAAT is a cultural project for the city Lisbon that is focused on three areas - Art, Architecture, and Technology. The €20m museum sits on the River Tagus (Rio Tejo) to the west of the city centre. and "one of Europe's most lyrical new museums". It establishes a connection between the new building and the Tejo Power Station, one of Portugal's most prominent examples of industrial architecture from the first half of the 20th century, and one of the most visited museums in the country. The museum is designed by Amanda Levete Architects.

MAAT's ambition is to present national and international exhibitions by contemporary artists, architects, and thinkers. The programme also includes various curatorial perspectives on EDP Foundation's Art Collection, reflecting current subject matters and trends. 

MAAT's programme opened on 30 June 2016 with four exhibitions held in renovated spaces of the Tejo Power Station building. On 5 October of the same year, the new building opened to the public with a large-scale work by French artist Dominique Gonzalez-Foerster, created specifically for this space. 

This is a project conceived for all kinds of public, of all ages, boasting an educational programme of multidisciplinary activities about art, architecture and technology – all initiatives which encourage creative thinking and new ways of acquiring and developing knowledge.

The museum hosted the Eurovision's "Blue Carpet" event, where all the contestants and their delegations are presented before the press, fans and public, on 6 May 2018. The official Opening Ceremony of the 2018 contest, which will take place at the nearby Electricity Museum.

On 19 December, 2019 part of the false ceiling in the entrance of the building collapsed as a result of storm Elsa.

References

External links 

  

Architecture museums
Art museums and galleries in Portugal
Culture in Lisbon
Museums in Lisbon
Contemporary art galleries in Europe
Science museums in Portugal
Museums established in 2016
2016 establishments in Portugal
2016 architecture